Ryan Cohen (born 1985 or 1986) is a Canadian entrepreneur and activist investor. He founded e-commerce company Chewy in 2011, and was the company's CEO until 2018. Cohen is currently the chairman of GameStop.

Early life 
Cohen was born to a Jewish family in Montreal. He never attended college, citing his father, who ran a glassware company, as his primary inspiration in pursuing an entrepreneurial route. His father died in December 2019.

Career
At the age of 15, Cohen started his first business collecting fees off referrals to various e-commerce sites. In 2011, at the age of 25, Cohen founded Chewy under its original name of MrChewy. Cohen says his inspiration for picking the pet category came from his experience shopping for his poodle Tylee. He cites his father Ted, who ran a glassware importing business, as a mentor. In need of capital, Cohen says he originally approached over 100 venture capital firms and was rejected by all of them. In 2013, Cohen secured the company's first outside investment from Volition Capital for $15 million. By 2016, he had raised capital from investors including BlackRock and T. Rowe Price New Horizons Fund. That year the company had $900 million in sales and had become the number 1 online pet retailer. By 2017, he raised $350 million and was preparing for an IPO.

In April 2017, PetSmart purchased Chewy for $3.35 billion in the largest e-commerce acquisition of all time. That year Fortune named Cohen one of its "40 under 40" and Vox named him to its Recode 100 list. Cohen remained CEO following the acquisition and operated the business largely as an independent unit of PetSmart. He grew the business to 3.5 billion in revenue in 2018 prior to stepping down as CEO to pursue personal goals and spend time with his family. In June 2019, Chewy went public at a valuation of $8.7 billion.

In January 2021, Cohen joined the GameStop board along with two Chewy executives. Cohen was also appointed chairman to lead a new committee in charge of a company-wide transformation. Cohen's appointment triggered a stock rally; within two weeks the stock had increased by 1,500% resulting from a short squeeze. Since then, Cohen has been instrumental in a number of changes at GameStop, including the departure of multiple executives and ten members of the board of directors, and the hiring of multiple Amazon and Chewy executives in leadership positions. He became chairman following the annual shareholder meeting.

Investments
Following the sale of Chewy, Cohen made a significant investment in Apple, making him the largest individual shareholder of the tech company with 1.55 million shares (6.2 million split-adjusted shares as of August 31, 2020).

In September 2020, Cohen disclosed a near 10% stake in GameStop, making him the company's biggest individual investor. This was later increased to 12.9% on December 17, 2020, through an amended 13D filing with SEC. According to these filings, Cohen's firm, RC Ventures, has expressed willingness to get more involved with the company in order “to produce the best results for all shareholders."

In March 2022, it was disclosed that Cohen had a near 10% stake in Bed Bath & Beyond, through his investment company RC Ventures LLC. Between August 15 and 18, his firm sold all of the stock, totaling 9.45 million shares. The profit was estimated at $68 million.

Legal
Cohen was named in a federal lawsuit on August 24, 2022 for an alleged fraudulent scheme to artificially inflate the price of Bed Bath & Beyond's publicly traded stock in a pump and dump. The suit alleges Cohen conspired with company CFO Gustavo Arnal to release "fraudulent and misleading SEC filings". It claims damages of $1.2 billion in a class action suit.

References

Living people
Canadian billionaires
Canadian company founders
Canadian investors
21st-century Canadian businesspeople
Year of birth uncertain
21st-century Canadian Jews
Businesspeople from Montreal
Year of birth missing (living people)